This is the list of commemorative coins of Estonia.

Re-establishment of Independence, 1991

See also

 Euro gold and silver commemorative coins (Estonia)

References

External links
  Bank of Estonia - Commemorative coins

Estonia
Currencies of Estonia